The Los Angeles Tribune was a newspaper published in Los Angeles, California in the 19th century. 

It was  published from 1886 to 1890 by Henry H. Boyce, once a partner with Los Angeles Times publisher Harrison Gray Otis. The two publications engaged in a "newspaper war", with both publishing stories that vilified the other.

References 

Newspapers published in Greater Los Angeles
1886 establishments in California
1890 disestablishments in California
Newspapers established in the 1880s
Publications disestablished in 1890